Jet Plane is the debut mini album by Japanese rock band Rumania Montevideo. The mini album was released on January 30, 1999, by indies label "Garage Indies Zapping Association". The album was reprinted on March 5, 1999.

Background
The album consists of total six tracks. All their songs are performed in English, not in Japanese.

The songs Jonathan and "Picnic" were later re-recorded as completely new songs with a new arrangement, lyrics, and composition.

Jonathan was released on their debut studio album Rumaniamania as Sayonara. Compared to Jonathan, the Sayonara is more than half minute longer. Picnic was released as a single Picnic on November, which was used as an opening theme for Anime television series Monster Rancher.

Jonathan, Picnic and Jet Plane were performed in acoustic live performance "UNDOWN vol.4".

The album was released in paper format for CD and a special mini booklet with lyrics and Q&A section.

Track listing

Personnel
Credits adapted from the CD booklet of Jet Plane.

Mami Miyoshi – vocals, lyrics, drums
Makoto Miyoshi - vocals, lyrics, composing, lead guitar, arranging
Satomi Makoshi – bass
Akiko Matsuda – saxophone, keyboard
Kazunobu Mashima – guitar
Hirohito Furui – arranging (Garnet Crow)
Yoshinori Akari – mixing
Shuji Yamada – assistant engineer
Yasuko Yamamoto – management
Takehiko Kawasaki – management
Rockaku – executive producing
Red Way Studio – recording, mixing
Koui Yaginuma – photo
Hitoshi Odajima – design
Sakiko Matsushita – design
Kazunori Okubo – supervisor
Tomoko Kataoka – as special thanx
Cule – A&R

References

1999 EPs
Japanese-language EPs
Being Inc. albums
Giza Studio albums
Rumania Montevideo albums
Albums produced by Daiko Nagato